Borislav Paravac (born 18 February 1943) is a Bosnian Serb politician who served as the 4th Serb member of the Presidency of Bosnia and Herzegovina from 2003 to 2006.

Previously, he was a member of both the national House of Peoples and House of Representatives. Paravac is a member of the Serb Democratic Party.

Early life and education
Paravac was born on 18 February 1943 in Kostajnica near Doboj in northern Bosnia and Herzegovina. He graduated from the Faculty of Economics at the University of Zagreb in 1966.

Career
From 13 October 1998 until 14 October 2000, Paravac was the member of the national House of Peoples. At the 2002 general election, he was elected to the national House of Representatives.

Following the dismissal of Mirko Šarović from his post at the Bosnian Presidency by the High Representative for Bosnia and Herzegovina, Lord Paddy Ashdown, Paravac was appointed to the post on 10 April 2003. He held the position of Presidency Chairman on two occasions. His term as Presidency member ended on 6 November 2006 and was succeeded by Nebojša Radmanović.

References

External links

1943 births
Living people
People from Doboj
Serbs of Bosnia and Herzegovina
Politicians of Republika Srpska
Members of the Presidency of Bosnia and Herzegovina
Chairmen of the Presidency of Bosnia and Herzegovina